The Annan Committee on the future of broadcasting was established in April 1974 to discuss the United Kingdom broadcasting industry, including new technologies and their funding, the role and funding of the BBC, Independent Broadcasting Authority and programme standards.

On 3 February 1977, the committee recommended:
 Changes to BBC funding by licence fee 
 Fourth, independent, television channel 
 Long-term restructure and diversification of broadcasting
 Establishment of Broadcasting Complaints Commission
 Privatisation of local radio
 Independence from direct political control
 Increase in independent production

Outcomes
 Increased licence fee
 Channel 4 (implemented in 1980)
 Channel 4 being of a more "open" nature rather than one of balance such as the BBC

Members
 Lord Annan
 Peter Goldman
 Professor Hilde Himmelweit
 Tom Jackson
 Sir Antony Jay
 Marghanita Laski
 Hilda M. Lawrence
 Dewi Lewis
 Sir James Mackay
 The Hon. Mrs Charles Morrison
 Dipak Nandy
 John G. Parkes
 John Pollock
 Professor Geoffrey Sims
 Phillip Whitehead MP
 Sir Marcus Worsley

References

British committees on broadcasting